Adam Bergendahl (born June 25, 1994) is a Swedish ice hockey player. He is currently playing with Njurunda SK of the Hockeytvåan.

Bergendahl played one game in the Elitserien (now the SHL) with Timrå IK during the 2012–13 Elitserien playoffs.

References

External links

1994 births
Living people
Swedish ice hockey right wingers
Timrå IK players
People from Sundsvall
Sportspeople from Västernorrland County